Carlo Amati (22 August 1776 – 23 March 1852) was an Italian architect.

Biography
Born in Monza, Amati studied under Giuseppe Parini and Leopoldo Pollack in the Accademia di Brera. Amati became an assistant to the brothers Albertolli, Giocondo and Giacomo Albertolli, then under abbot Zanoia. Amati was a contemporary of Giacomo Moraglia.

Amati designed the facade of the church of San Carlo al Corso in Milan, the city in which he died.

References

External links 
 

1776 births
1852 deaths
Architects from Milan
18th-century Italian architects
19th-century Italian architects